Pehli Nazar Ka Pyaar is a 2008 romantic Hindi film directed by Arshad khan and starring Divvij kak Sweety chhabra Arbaaz Ali Khan, Vikas Anand, Rahul, Dinesh Hingoo and Tej Sapru in lead roles.

Cast
Divvij kak
Swity chhabra
 Arbaaz Ali Khan
 Vikas Anand 
 Rahul
 Dinesh Hingoo
 Tej Sapru

Music
"Bheegi Bheegi Raaton Mein Yeh Dil Jalne Laga" - Shaan, Shreya Ghoshal
"Dil Ke Bekarariyon" - Kumar Sanu, Shreya Ghoshal
"Har Imtihan Le Lo" - Madhushree, Ali-Ghani
"Kya Ho Raha Hai Kuchh Bhi Samaj Mein Na Aaye" - Kumar Sanu, Shreya Ghoshal
"Mahiya Maine Dil Haan Tujhe De Diya" - Shaan, Kalpana Patowary
"O Soniya" - Pamela Jain, Javed Ali, Shaan
"Tu Hi Ishwar" - Shehzad, Sameer
"Tujhe Rab Da" - Madhushree, Ali-Ghani

References

2008 films
2000s Hindi-language films
Films scored by Ali-Ghani